A Corazón Abierto is the eleventh studio album recorded by Mexican singer Alejandro Fernández that contains a selection of tracks that cross the rhythmic pop and the romantic ballad, this album shows the best of Alejandro, exploring melodies that go from the spiritual up to the sensual, reflecting his love and passion. This is a Contemporary Pop album with Mexican flavor produced by Kike Santander and Áureo Baqueiro with songs of big composers as: Gian Marco, Leonel García of Sin Bandera, Reyli Barba and Kike Santander. He shot videos for the songs "Me Dediqué A Perderte", "Qué Lástima" and "Canta Corazón". The first single went on to sell over 63,000 digital downloads in Mexico alone.

Track listing

CD
Source: Official Website

DVD
 Me Dediqué A Perderte (Video)
 Alejandro – De Gira
 Cronología
 Lucharé Por Tu Amor (Video)

Personnel

Pablo Alfaro – photography
Esteban Aristizabal – vocal engineer
Pablo Arraya – engineer, vocal engineer
Aureo Baqueiro – percussion, arranger, keyboards, programming, producer, engineer, fender rhodes, vocal arrangement, string arrangements, art direction, direction, A&R
Daniel Betancourt – arranger, keyboards, programming, producer
Gustavo Borner – mixing, string engineer
Richard Bravo – percussion
Rodrigo Cárdenas – bass
Jason Carder – trumpet
Luis Angel Cortez – assistant
Mike Couzzi – string engineer
Ian Cuttler – art direction, design
Pepe Damián – drums
Fernando de Santiago – vihuela
Beto Dominguez – percussion
Vicky Echeverri – chorus
Paul Forat – art direction, A&R
Luis Gil – drum engineering
Manny López – acoustic guitar
Bill Meyers – string arrangements
Miami Symphonic Strings – strings
Boris Milan – mixing
Sergio Minski – production coordination
José Antonio Molina – string arrangements
Marco Moreno – assistant, pro-tools
Novi Novag – viola, string arrangements
Alfredo Oliva – concert comedian
Daniel Ortega – electric guitar
Wendy Pederson – chorus
Richie Perez – engineer
Pancho Ruiz – electric bass
Milton Salcedo – piano, arranger, keyboards, programming, producer, fender rhodes, wind arrangements
Freddie Sandoval – engineer
Kike Santander – acoustic guitar, arranger, producer, Spanish guitar, wind arrangements
Marco Antonio Santiago – guitarron
Dana Teboe – trumpet
Ramiro Teran – chorus, engineer
Don C. Tyler – mastering
Juan Jose Virviescas – engineer

Chart performance

Album

Singles

Sales and certifications

References

2004 albums
Alejandro Fernández albums
Albums produced by Kike Santander